Holyoke Public Schools (HPS) is a school district serving the city of Holyoke, Massachusetts, United States.

Schools

High schools
 Holyoke High School
 North Campus
 South Campus/Dean Campus

Middle & Elementary Schools
 William R. Peck Full Service Community School
Maurice A. Donahue School
Dr. Marcella R. Kelly School
Lt. Elmer J. McMahon School
William Morgan School
Lt. Clayre P. Sullivan School
Edward Nelson White School
Veritas Prep Holyoke

Pre-schools and Alternative Schools
Center for Excellence (formally Holyoke Alternative Program)
Metcalf Early Childhood Pre-School

See also
 List of school districts in Massachusetts
Holyoke, Massachusetts

Notes

References

External links
 Official site
 Holyoke (01370000), School and District Profiles, Massachusetts Dept. of Elementary and Secondary Education 
 Holyoke Public Schools Media Center, YouTube

Education in Hampden County, Massachusetts
Holyoke, Massachusetts
School districts in Massachusetts